Burmese (1962–1990), a black Police Service Horse (PSH) mare, was given to Queen Elizabeth II by the Royal Canadian Mounted Police and ridden by the Queen for Trooping the Colour for 18 consecutive years, from 1969 to 1986. Burmese was trained by RCMP Staff Sergeant Fred Rasmussen and presented by Staff Sergeant Ralph Cave in 1969.

Royal service
Burmese was foaled at the Royal Canadian Mounted Police Remount Ranch at Fort Walsh, Saskatchewan, and was trained in Ottawa by RCMP Staff Sergeant Fred Rasmussen. Staff Sergeant Ralph Cave, the Riding Master for the Musical Ride, suggested in 1968 that the RCMP gift one of the ride's horses to Canada's monarch, Queen Elizabeth II. Both the federal Cabinet and the RCMP's Commissioner supported the idea and, on 28 April 1969, Burmese was presented to the Queen when members of the Royal Canadian Mounted Police came to the UK to perform in the Royal Windsor Horse Show. The Queen asked that Burmese be included in the performance and that her rider carry the Queen's royal standard, instead of the normal red and white pennon, so Elizabeth could more easily follow Burmese in the show.

The Queen was mounted on Burmese when six blank shots were fired during the 1981 birthday parade, on the way to Trooping the Colour. Although the horse was briefly startled, she remained calm due to the training she received at Depot Division in Regina, Saskatchewan. This included experience of gunfire during recruit training, when staff would fire blank rounds as recruits took horses through their paces. The Royal Family praised Burmese's behaviour during this incident.

Burmese's last public appearance was at Trooping the Colour in 1986, after which she retired. She was not replaced, as the Queen decided to ride in a phaeton (carriage) and review the troops from a dais from 1987 onwards, rather than train a new charger. Burmese was put out to pasture at Windsor Castle's Park, where she died in 1990. When the Queen was asked many years later which was her favourite horse, her immediate reply was, “Burmese.”

Subsequent horses given by the RCMP to Elizabeth II and Charles III

PSH Burmese was followed by PSH Centenial (also trained by Rasmussen), presented to the Queen in 1973 to celebrate the 100th anniversary of the RCMP (the spelling of Centenial was changed by the Queen from the original spelling of Centennial); and PSH Saint James, in 1998, to mark the RCMP's 125th anniversary. The Queen was presented in 2002 with PSH Golden Jubilee in honour of her Golden Jubilee year and PSH George in 2009, to commemorate the 40th anniversary of the gifting of Burmese to the Queen. PSH Elizabeth, named for the Queen's mother, Queen Elizabeth The Queen Mother, was presented to Elizabeth II on 10 May 2012.

The RCMP gifted Elizabeth's son and successor, and honorary Commissioner of the RCMP, King Charles III, with a Musical Ride horse named Noble, on 11 March 2023, to mark the 150th anniversary of the force's founding. The King requested a horse from the Musical Ride to eventually use as his new charger horse in Trooping the Colour parades; he has, so far, been using PSH George since that horse was given to Queen Elizabeth II.

Statues

During Saskatchewan's centennial in 2005, the Queen unveiled a bronze statue in front of the Saskatchewan Legislative Building in Regina, Canada, where she is depicted on Burmese. The statue was sculpted by Saskatchewan artist Susan Velder.

A statue of Elizabeth II riding Centenial was unveiled on Parliament Hill in Ottawa, Ontario, on 1 July 1992, Canada Day in the 40th year of her reign as Queen of Canada and the 125th anniversary of Confederation. A team of 10 people took two years to complete the monument. When a decade-long renovation of all the buildings in the parlaimentary complex began, the statue was moved to the centre of the roundabout outside the main gate to the monarch's official residence in Ottawa, Rideau Hall.

See also
Monarchy in Saskatchewan
Queen Elizabeth's horses
List of historical horses

References

External links

RCMP Website

1962 animal births
1990 animal deaths
Animals as diplomatic gifts
British monarchy
Ceremonial horses
Horse monuments
Individual mares